Aegus chelifer, is a species of stag beetle found in Indo-Malaya regional countries.

Distribution
It is a widespread species of stag beetles found extensively throughout Indo-Malayan regions, west of Wallace's line, including: India, Bangladesh, Sri Lanka, Andaman and Nicobar islands, Myanmar, Thailand, Singapore, Laos, Vietnam, Cambodia, Malayan peninsula, Sumatra and Borneo. However, the species was recently found from Seychelles and Madagascar as an introduced species. The major cause for this is the dispersal event of large number of floating tree trunks from coastal forests of South East Asia which were carried westward by the South Equatorial Current during 2004 Indian Ocean earthquake and tsunami.

Description
Body length is about 15.0 to 39.5 mm. This species shows great intraspecific variation in their body sizes. Males can be divided into two morphs based on their mandible size as minor and major morphs.

Biology
A saproxylic species, adults and grubs are generally found in deadwood of broadleaf trees, under bark or fallen tree trunks, in forest patches near human settlements and firewood heaps. Male stag beetles usually involve aggressive behavior using their long mandibles to compete with rival males over females. Grubs are almost found within decaying wood or other decomposing substrates, where they feed on materials rich in fungal growth.

Subspecies
Six subspecies have been identified.

 Aegus chelifer chelifer Macleay, 1819
 Aegus chelifer crassodontus Bomans, 1992
 Aegus chelifer kandiensis (Hope & Westwood, 1845)
 Aegus chelifer nitidus Boileau, 1899
 Aegus chelifer roepstorffi Waterhouse, 1890
 Aegus chelifer tonkinensis Kriesche, 1920

Gallery

References 

Lucanidae
Insects of Sri Lanka
Insects of India
Insects described in 1819